Theudius is a Greek mathematician of 4th century BCE, born in Magnesia, a member of the Platonic Academy and a contemporary of Aristotle. He is only known from Proclus’ commentary to Euclid, where Theudius is said to have had "a reputation for excellence in mathematics as in the rest of philosophy, for he produced admirable "Elements" and made many partial theorems more general".

The "Elements" of Theudius are probably the source for Aristotle's mathematical examples.

References

Sources

External links
Proclus. In primum Euclidis Elementorum librum commentarii. Ed. G. Friedlein. Leipzig, 1873, 67.12-16).

Ancient Greek mathematicians
Year of birth unknown
Year of death unknown
4th-century BC mathematicians